Cyprinodon rubrofluviatilis, known as the Red River pupfish, is a species of pupfish from the United States. It is found only in the Red River of the South and Brazos River drainages of Texas and Oklahoma.

It was first described by Henry Weed Fowler in 1916, as a subspecies of the species Cyprinodon bovinus; the specific epithet  refers to the Red River.

References

Further reading

rubrofluviatilis
Endemic fauna of Oklahoma
Endemic fauna of Texas
Fish of the Eastern United States
Freshwater fish of the United States
Brazos River
Red River of the South
Taxa named by Henry Weed Fowler
Fish described in 1916